Bowling Green State University Department of Popular Culture is the first Popular Culture department in the United States. The department was founded by Professor Ray Browne in 1973. The Popular Culture department is unique as it is the only one in the US to offer both Bachelor's degrees and Master's degrees in Popular Culture.

History

Popular Culture House 
On July 21, 2012, Bowling Green State University announced their plans to demolish the Popular Culture building that housed the department. The Popular Culture building was home to four former presidents of the university before the Popular Culture department moved in. The building was purchased by the university in 1932, and was formerly called Virgil House. Over 2000 supporters protested the demolition plans of the Popular Culture building. However the protests were unsuccessful and the university continued with plans to demolish the building. The building was demolished on August 10, 2012, one week ahead of time. The demolished Popular Culture house was replaced by a student health center. The Popular Culture department moved into Shatzel Hall, alongside the Asian Studies department.

Faculty and staff 
For the 2018/19 school year, the faculty and staff are
 Jeffrey Brown, Professor
 Charles Coletta, Lecturer
 Becca Cragin, Associate professor
 Matthew Donahue, Lecturer
 Montana Miller, Associate professor
 Angela Nelson, Associate professor
 Kristen Rudisill, Associate professor
 Jack Santino, Professor
 Jeremy Wallach, Professor

Retired or emeritus faculty include:
 Ray B. Browne (1922–2009)
 Christopher D. Geist
 Michael T. Marsden
 Marilyn Motz
 John G. Nachbar

Other Former Faculty
 Carl B. Holmberg
 Jon Michael Spencer

References

External links 
 Bowling Green State University, Popular Culture Department

Bowling Green State University
Popular culture studies
University departments in the United States
1973 establishments in Ohio